"Defund the police" is a slogan that supports removing funds from police departments and reallocating them to non-policing forms of public safety and community support, such as social services, youth services, housing, education, healthcare and other community resources. Activists who use the phrase may do so with varying intentions; some seek modest reductions, while others argue for full divestment as a step toward the abolition of contemporary police services. Activists who support the defunding of police departments often argue that investing in community programs could provide a better crime deterrent for communities; funds would go toward addressing social issues, like poverty, homelessness, and mental disorders. Police abolitionists call for replacing existing police forces with other systems of public safety, like housing, employment, community health, education, and other programs.

The "defund the police" slogan became common during the George Floyd protests starting in May 2020. According to Jenna Wortham and Matthew Yglesias, the slogan was popularized by the Black Visions Collective shortly after the murder of George Floyd.

Black Lives Matter, the Movement for Black Lives, and other activists have used the phrase to call for police budget reductions and to delegate certain police responsibilities to other organizations. In Black Reconstruction in America, first published in 1935, W. E. B. Du Bois wrote about "abolition-democracy", which advocated for the removal of institutions that were rooted in racist and repressive practices, including prisons, convict leasing, and white police forces. In the 1960s, activists such as Angela Davis advocated for the defunding or abolition of police departments. The 2017 book The End of Policing by Alex S. Vitale has been called "a manual of sorts for the defund movement".

Many sociologists, criminologists, and journalists have criticized aspects of the police defunding movement. In the United States, politicians from both the Democratic and Republican parties have spoken against defunding, although Republicans have sought to link Democrats to the movement in congressional races, and in 2021, the Biden administration rebutted by arguing Republicans were trying to defund the police. Among the general public in the United States, the concept of defunding is unpopular.

Background 
Since the 1960s, municipal governments have increasingly spent larger portions of their budgets on law enforcement. This is partially rooted in the "war on crime", launched by President Lyndon B. Johnson, which prioritized crime control via law enforcement and prisons. Meanwhile, police unions have wielded significant power in local politics, due to direct endorsements of political candidates and funding of campaigns. Police department budgets have been considered "untouchable" for decades.

By 2020, U.S. cities collectively spent approximately $115 billion per year on policing.  In particular, in Los Angeles in 2020, the LAPD budget constituted about 18% of the city's budget ($1.86 billion out of $10.5 billion) and about 54% of the city's general funds (i.e., tax revenues that are not designated for special purposes). In Chicago in 2020, the CPD constituted about 18% of the city's budget and 40% of the city's general funds ($1.6 billion). In New York City in 2020, the NYPD budget constituted about 6% of the city's budget ($5.9 billion out of $97.8 billion), the third largest budget after the Department of Education and the Department of Social Services. In Minneapolis, the budget for the police and corrections departments grew 41% between 2009 and 2019.

As of 2017, state and local government spending on policing has remained just under 4% of general expenditures for the past 40 years. In 2017, over 95% went towards operational costs, such as salaries and benefits. While the officers per capita in major cities have not significantly changed, they have been equipped with more technology, gear, and training in the last few decades. On average, large cities spend about 8% of their general expenditures on policing, 5% on housing, and 3% on parks. Most cities' police budgets are larger than other public safety departments, especially during the COVID-19 pandemic, where other budgets lessened but policing budgets were largely untouched.

Rationale

Effectiveness of police 

Police defunding and abolition activists argue that the police have a poor track record of resolving cases related to murder, rape, and domestic abuse. Some further argue that police social work intervention leads to mass incarceration, risk of physical and mental harm, exposure to violence, and in some instances, death.

According to a 2020 study from The Washington Post, there is no correlation, positive or negative, between annual per capita police funding and per capita violent and overall crime rates.

Racism 

Critics argue that the history of policing is rooted in racist practices, citing slave patrols, enforcement of Jim Crow laws, and repression of the civil rights movement, such as the Selma to Montgomery marches and the government's violent campaign against Black Panther Party leaders such as Fred Hampton.

Unbundling of services 

Critics argue that police officers and police departments provide too many services. According to this argument, the United States has an over-reliance on law enforcement, which is expected to handle an unrealistically wide range of social issues, such as homelessness, mental health, and substance abuse. For these reasons, some activists have called for an unbundling of services. Under this model, many services that were previously provided by law enforcement would be provided by specialized response teams. These teams could include social workers, emergency medical technicians, conflict resolution specialists, restorative justice teams, and other community-based professionals.

Police officers may be particularly badly suited for some community issues, such as mental health crises. One in four people who are killed by the police have severe mental illness. Some activists argue that, if someone is experiencing a mental health crisis, and if there is no emergent threat to themselves or other people, mental health professionals may be more adept and capable responders. Some activists also believe that if more funds were diverted to help treat and support those with mental health issues, there could be better outcomes.

A 2020 paper by researchers at the RAND Corporation argues that the police are often given too many roles in society and asked to solve issues that they are not properly trained for and that would be better suited for professionals such as mental health, homelessness, drug abuse, and school related violence. A September 2020 paper by Taleed El-Sabawi of Elon University School of Law and Jennifer J. Carroll of North Carolina State University outlines the considerations in setting up such programs and includes model legislation.

The 2021 American Rescue Plan included about a billion dollars available for reimbursing 85% of the costs for governments that implement these kinds of programs, and as of April 2021 at least 14 cities were reportedly interested.

While the movement has roots primarily in the work of left-wing police abolition scholars and activists, it also has the support from many libertarians, though they rarely use the slogan "defund the police". Libertarians support the movement out of a concern for constitutional rights and a stance against what they consider far-reaching and ever-expanding powers given to state actors (for example, qualified immunity).

Effect on crime 

The extent to which defunding police leads to a rise in crime has been challenged by scholars and policy experts. Criminologist Richard Rosenfeld argues that the increased rate of crime which followed the George Floyd protests was more linked to the COVID-19 pandemic than calls for police defunding, noting that while violent crime rates had increased, property crime rates had decreased, which he said showed evidence that crime was more connected to COVID-19 lockdowns. Patrick Sharkey, another criminologist, attributed the increase in crime to the Ferguson effect, arguing that "when you depend on the police to dominate public spaces and they suddenly step back from that role, violence can increase." In Austin, Texas, after U.S. Representative Michael McCaul said defunding the police had led to an increased rate of homicides, fact checkers said it was "hard to draw the conclusion the homicide rate is up strictly because of reallocating police funding."

Responses

Social scientists 

According to Princeton sociologist Patrick Sharkey, the best evidence available shows that while police are effective in reducing violence, there is also a growing body of evidence that demonstrates community organizations can play a central role in reducing violence:

In an interview with The Atlantic, Sharkey stated, "Police presence can reduce violence, but there are lots of other things that reduce violence, too. Business improvement districts reduce violence. University security organizations reduce violence. It's possible that relying on police isn't as necessary as we once thought, and that we might even have safer communities without many of them." In an interview with Vox, Sharkey acknowledged the effectiveness of aggressive policing and mass incarceration in reducing violence, but said these methods have "had staggering costs". He went on to say "The next model should be one driven primarily by residents and local organizations as the central actors. Police still certainly have a role to play, but responding to violent crime takes up only a tiny fraction of police officers' time. So the idea here is that we can rely on residents and local organizations to take over most of the duties that [officers] currently handle and make sure neighborhoods are safe."

Criminologists Justin Nix and Scott Wolfe state in The Washington Post, "We have enough research evidence to be concerned about the immediate impact of drastic budget cuts or wholesale disbanding of police agencies: Crime and victimization will increase. ... These collateral consequences will disproportionately harm minority communities that need help, not further marginalization." They go on to state that, "Cities that have more police officers per capita tend to have lower crime rates. This does not necessarily mean we need to hire more police. Rather, having more officers per capita provides greater ability to dedicate resources to community- and problem-oriented policing approaches that have been shown to reduce crime and improve community satisfaction." They further argue that police departments need to be held more accountable for their use of funds, suggesting more emphasis on evidence-based practices, and say that making the police responsible for so many social ills should be reconsidered, although stating the infrastructure to handle those should be in place before reallocating funds.

Kevin Robinson, a retired police chief and lecturer of criminology and criminal justice at Arizona State University, suggests that the slogan "defund the police" is misguided. He states that a more appropriate terminology would be "re-allocation" of specific portions of police department budgets. He states that most such budgets are tight, but says that a thorough review of spending is always warranted, and that program effectiveness should determine whether or not a program is continued. He says that criminals usually weigh the possibility of getting caught when committing a crime, and that "if there is a low likelihood of apprehension there will be more crimes committed—more people victimized." He further states that "Studies have shown ... that effective social programs can reduce criminality in adults and juveniles", and encourages police departments to incorporate social programs with police work.

Sociologist Rashawn Ray, writing for the Brookings Institution, states that much of what police do is misaligned with their skillset and training, and suggests that a reduction in their workload would increase their ability to solve violent crimes. He further states: One consistent finding in the social science literature is that if we really want to reduce crime, education equity and the establishment of a work infrastructure is the best approach. A study using 60 years of data found that an increase in funding for police did not significantly relate to a decrease in crime. Throwing more police on the street to solve a structural problem is one of the reasons why people are protesting in the streets. Defunding police—reallocating funding away from police departments to other sectors of government—may be more beneficial for reducing crime and police violence.

Media
Matthew Yglesias, writing in Vox, criticized police defunding and abolition activists for lacking a plan for how to deal with violent crime, and for ignoring the substantial literature finding that having more police leads to less violent crime. He stated that their dismissal of police reform ignores that even modest reforms have been shown to reduce police misconduct. He writes that across government as a whole, only a very small portion of spending goes to the police, and that while more social spending would probably reduce crime, that does not need to come out of police budgets, noting that the United States actually has 35% fewer police officers per capita than the rest of the world. He also states that abolishing public police services would lead to a surge in the use of private security services by those who can afford them, and that such services would lack accountability.

The slogan's relation to the police abolition movement has been described as a motte-and-bailey fallacy by John Murawski at RealClearInvestigations. According to him, when "defund the police" is criticized as tantamount to police abolition by opponents, proponents provide a moderate interpretation in terms of police demilitarization until the criticisms are addressed, only to return to more radical interpretations later.

Christy E. Lopez, in a column for The Washington Post, supported the idea of defunding the police, stating that reform is not enough. She says that goals vary within the movement, and that "[d]efunding the police means shrinking the scope of police responsibilities and shifting most of what government does to keep us safe to entities that are better equipped to meet that need. It means investing more in mental-health care and housing, and expanding the use of community mediation and violence interruption programs."

In light of the violence in New York City's streets, Al Sharpton has declared:

Public opinion

A YouGov opinion poll with fieldwork on May 29–30, 2020, found that less than 20% of American adults supported funding cuts for policing, with similar levels of support among Republicans and Democrats.

In a poll conducted by ABC News/Ipsos of 686 participants, on June 10–11, 34% of US adults supported "the movement to 'defund the police and 64% opposed it. Support was higher among black Americans (57%) than among whites (26%) and Hispanics (42%), and higher among Democrats (55%) than among Republicans or Independents.

A June 23 – July 6 survey by Gallup found that 81% of African Americans wanted police to spend the same amount of time or more time in their neighborhoods, as did 86% of the sample as a whole.

Politicians

Democratic Party 
Joe Biden, the presumptive Democratic presidential nominee who would go on to win the 2020 election, opposed defunding police forces, arguing instead that policing needed substantial reform. In his State of the Union Address of 2022, Biden drew bipartisan approval when he said: "We should all agree: The answer is not to defund the police. It's to fund the police". U.S. Senator Bernie Sanders also opposed defunding, arguing for more accountability for police, along with better education and training, and making their job better defined. U.S. Senator Cory Booker said he understood the sentiment behind the slogan but would not use it. U.S. Representative and Congressional Black Caucus chair Karen Bass said, "I do think that, in cities, in states, we need to look at how we are spending the resources and invest more in our communities. Maybe this is an opportunity to re-envision public safety."

On November 9, 2020, House Majority Whip Jim Clyburn stated that Defund the police' is killing our party, and we've got to stop it." Clyburn argued that the phrase was reminiscent of the similarly radical phrase "burn, baby, burn" used in the racial protests of the 1960s, which undermined broad support for dismantling racial injustice.

A small minority of the progressive lawmakers within the Democratic Party including Ilhan Omar, Rashida Tlaib, Alexandria Ocasio-Cortez support defunding the police, believing that "Policing in our country is inherently & intentionally racist" and thus have called for police departments to be dismantled.

In a December 2020 interview with journalist Peter Hamby, former U.S. President Barack Obama said that using "defund the police" may cause politicians to lose support and make their statements less effective.

Republican Party 
U.S. President Donald Trump on June 4, 2020, tweeted "The Radical Left Democrats new theme is 'Defund the Police'. Remember that when you don't want Crime, especially against you and your family. This is where Sleepy Joe is being dragged by the socialists. I am the complete opposite, more money for Law Enforcement! #LAWANDORDER".

In the 2020 elections, Republicans running in competitive districts successfully flipped many Democratic-held seats by associating the Democratic candidate with the slogan. In competitive House of Representatives and Senate races, Republicans attacked their Democratic opponents by claiming, often falsely, that the Democratic candidate supports defunding the police. Both Democrats and Republicans have cited association with the defunding movement as a contributing factor in the Democrats' loss of seats in the 2020 House elections and the poorer than expected results in other Democratic campaigns.

Cities

New York City 

In New York City, activists and lawmakers asked Mayor Bill de Blasio in April 2020 to use cuts to the police budget to make up for shortfalls caused by the Coronavirus pandemic. In June, during the Floyd protests, a group of 48 candidates for city office, along with Brooklyn College's Policing and Social Justice Project, asked the city council to reduce the NYPD budget by $1 billion over four years. City comptroller Scott Stringer said the city could save $1.1 billion over four years by cutting the numbers of police and reducing overtime and could divert the funds to "social workers, counselors, community-based violence interrupters, and other trained professionals". On June 15, 2020, Police Commissioner Dermot Shea announced that the NYPD would eliminate its plainclothes police units in the precinct-level and Housing Bureau anti-crime teams, and the officers would be reassigned to community policing and detective work. As of August 2020, New York City had cut $1 billion from the police budget, but this mostly involved shifting some responsibilities to other city agencies, with the size of the force barely changing. Some black and Latino members of the city council opposed major cuts to policing, with the majority leader saying it was "colonization" pushed by white progressives, while others supported more cuts. In the 2021 New York City mayoral election primary, candidates who campaigned to reduce police spending finished behind others who had not, and the winner, Eric Adams, had promised to increase the city's police force.

Los Angeles and San Francisco 

In Los Angeles, Mayor Eric Garcetti has said he would cut as much as $150 million from the Los Angeles Police Department's (LAPD) budget, a reversal of his planned increase of $120 million. Garcetti announced the funds would be redirected to community initiatives. In San Francisco, Mayor London Breed announced a plan to redirect some police funds to the city's African-American community, and she announced that police will no longer respond to non-criminal calls. However, in December 2021, after a reported spike in crime and drug dealing in the Tenderloin district, she announced her intention to flood the district streets with police in order to contain the emergency. In Milwaukee, an activist group called African-American Roundtable, formed by 65 organizations, asked the city to divert $75 million from the police budget to public health and housing.

Minneapolis 

In Minneapolis, activist groups Reclaim the Block and Black Visions Collective requested for the police budget to be cut by $45 million. Members of the Minneapolis City Council signed a pledge to dismantle the police and create new public safety systems. City council member Lisa Bender explained, "Our commitment is to end policing as we know it and to recreate systems of public safety that actually keep us safe." In September, the pledge was set aside. Pledge signer Andrew Johnson clarified that he had supported the pledge only in spirit, not literally. Lisa Bender, the council president, said that different interpretations of the pledge by different council members had created confusion. The New York Times reported that the pledge "has been rejected by the city's mayor, a plurality of residents in recent public opinion polls, and an increasing number of community groups. Taking its place have been the types of incremental reforms that the city's progressive politicians had denounced." 

By the end of 2020, as the city was dealing with a spike in violent crime, Minneapolis officials agreed to a 4.5 percent shift of the city's $179 million annual police budget to violence prevention programs and non-emergency services, which was far short of the sweeping changes demanded by activists and pledged by local lawmakers in the wake of Floyd's murder. In the 2021 Minneapolis municipal election, voters rejected a ballot measure to amend the city's charter to eliminate a required minimum number of police officers based on the city's population and that would have replaced the police department with a department of public safety. By the end of 2021, city officials had restored police funding in Minneapolis to $191 millionthe funding level prior the resource diversion following the murder of George Floyd in 2020.

Other U.S. cities 
In 2020, local policymakers in Philadelphia, Baltimore, Washington, D.C., San Francisco and other US cities have supported some form of defunding or opposing budget increases.

In Nashville on June 2, 2020, a city budget hearing lasted over ten hours to accommodate the large numbers of residents waiting to take their turn to ask the city to defund the police.

In August 2020, the Austin City Council unanimously voted to cut $150 million, about one third, from the Austin Police Departments budget. About $80 million of the cuts consists of moving several civilian functions from the police department to other parts of city government, and $50 million is for "alternative forms of public safety". The other $20 million is to be reallocated to other city programs including violence prevention, abortion access, and food access.

On November 2, 2021, the city of Des Moines, Iowa, elected Indira Sheumaker to the office of City Council representing Ward 1 of the city—comprising the most diverse neighborhoods in the city. She defeated incumbent Bill Gray on a platform of defunding the police, decentralizing city government, and establishing community owned utilities. During her campaign, Indira was fighting felony charges stemming from an altercation with a police officer at the Iowa State Capitol.

Police unions 

The Los Angeles Police Protective League said defunding the police would be the "quickest way to make our neighborhoods more dangerous" and that "at this time ... 'defunding' the LAPD is the most irresponsible thing anyone can propose."

Outside the United States 
In Canada, politicians in major cities have expressed interest in diverting some police funds. In Toronto, city councilors Josh Matlow and Kristyn Wong-Tam have planned to propose a 10% cut to the police budget. Doctors for Defunding the Police have advocated for widespread reforms. In Montreal, Mayor Valérie Plante has said she is in talks about the police budget.

In Scotland, a violence reduction unit run by Police was set up in 2005, which aims to prevent violence with educational and outreach programs.

Former British Prime Minister Tony Blair criticized defund the police in a 2021 article for the New Statesman, describing it as "voter-repellent" and "the left's most damaging political slogan since 'the dictatorship of the proletariat. Blair furthermore claimed that the slogan "leaves the right with an economic message which seems more practical and a powerful cultural message around defending flag, family and fireside traditional values." Both the leaderships of the British Labour Party and the Conservative Party have pledged not to defund any British police forces.

See also 

 Abolish ICE
 Criminal justice reform
 Evidence-based policing
 Ferguson effect
 George Floyd protests
 Institutional racism
 Police abolition movement
 Prison abolition movement

References 

Law enforcement
Black Lives Matter
Politics and race in the United States
Race and law in the United States
Urban politics in the United States
Civil rights in the United States
Police misconduct in the United States
Political movements in the United States
Police abolition movement